Omega Lithium was a Croatian industrial metal band. The band was formed in 2007 and is signed to Drakkar Entertainment, a part of Sony BMG. The band's debut album, Dreams in Formaline, was released on 18 September 2009.

Career 
The first single from the debut album was "Stigmata".  The single was played on the MTV rock chart and peaked to the 4 place on the MTV Adria Rock chart, receiving a constant airplay for more than 2 months. The video appeared on other European and worldwide TV stations in their daily charts.
 
On YouTube "Stigmata" received more than a quarter of a million views, which is the highest viewing number for a debut song in this genre.

The band toured with the German folk metal band Subway to Sally on their Kreuzfeuer tour from 18 to 30 December 2009. 

They headlined the 2nd stage on Metal Camp 2010, appeared on Wave Gothic Treffen and concluded the Dreams in Formaline tour with a performance on Metal Female Voices Fest 2010. On 26 February 2010, they announced that a North American version of the debut album Dreams in Formaline will be released by Artoffact Records on 6 April and will include a bonus track.

The band released their second album Kinetik in 2011 via Drakkar Entertainment/Sony Music. It was recorded in Horus Studio in Hannover and was co-produced by the band's guitarist Malice Rime, and produced by Žare Pak. The band disbanded in 2011. Afterwards Marko Matijević Sekul (Malice Rime) and Zoltan Lečei (Zoltan Harpax) went on to form industrial folk metal band Manntra, while Teodor Klaj (Torsten Nihill) joined Croatian death/thrash metal band Monox.

Awards
They were awarded as "Newcomer of the year 2009" by Zillo (one of the leading German's alternative music magazines).

They were also awarded as "Newcomer of the year 2009" on Sonic Seducer (Also one of the German's leading alternative music magazines)

Lineup

Final lineup
 Mya Mortensen – vocals (2008-2011)
 Malice Rime – guitars, synthesizers, backing vocals (2007-2011)
 Zoltan Harpax – bass, lyrics (2007-2011)
 Torsten Nihill – drums, percussion (2007-2011)

Former members
 Andrea Zuppani – vocals (2007-2008)

Discography

Albums
 Dreams in Formaline (2009)
 Kinetik (2011)

Singles & EPs
 Andromeda (2007)
 Colossus (2011)
 Dance With Me (2011)

References

External links
 Omega Lithium Page on Myspace
 Omega Lithium Band Profile on VampireFreaks.com 
 Reverbnation.com article

Croatian heavy metal musical groups
Gothic metal musical groups
Industrial metal musical groups
Musical groups established in 2007
Drakkar Entertainment artists